Manuchihr ibn Shavur was a Shaddadid emir of Ani from  1072 to 1118, the first of the dynasty to rule this key city, formerly an Armenian royal capital. 

Manuchihr b. Shavur began his rule under the suzerainty of the Seljuk sultan Malikshah. During his reign, Ani suffered a famine and military pressure from the Seljuks. Manuchihr sponsored several building projects, including a mosque, fortifications, a large bath, and a caravansarai. He also patronized the poet Asadi Tusi. He was succeeded by his son, Abu'l-Aswar Shavur ibn Manuchihr.

References 

Shaddadid emirs of Ani
11th-century rulers in Asia
12th-century rulers in Asia
11th-century Kurdish people
12th-century Kurdish people